This list of National Historic Landmarks in Illinois, has 88 entries including Eads Bridge, which spans into Missouri and which the National Park Service credits to Missouri's National Historic Landmark list.  Also added are two sites that were once National Historic Landmarks before having their designations removed.  All National Historic Landmarks of the United States are also listed on the more general, National Register of Historic Places.

The National Historic Landmark Program is administered by the National Park Service, a branch of the Department of the Interior. The National Park Service determines which properties meet NHL criteria and makes nomination recommendations after an owner notification process. The Secretary of the Interior reviews nominations and, based on a set of predetermined criteria, makes a decision on NHL designation or a determination of eligibility for designation. Both public and privately owned properties can be designated as NHLs. This designation provides indirect, partial protection of the historic integrity of the properties via tax incentives, grants, monitoring of threats, and other means. Owners may object to the nomination of the property as a NHL. When this is the case the Secretary of the Interior can only designate a site as eligible for designation.

Current NHLs in Illinois

 Numbers represent an ordering by significant words.  Different colors, defined here, differentiate the National Historic Landmark Districts from other NHL buildings, structures, sites or objects.

|}

Former NHLs in Illinois

See also
National Register of Historic Places listings in Illinois
List of National Historic Landmarks by state

Notes

References

External links
    Note this lists 85 current NHLs as well as 1 withdrawn NHL, and hence the overall count of 84 is due to crediting one (Eads Bridge) to Missouri.
 National Historic Landmarks Program, at National Park Service

 
Illinois
National Historic Landmarks
National Historic Landmarks